The 2019 Men's EuroHockey Championship IV was the 8th edition of the EuroHockey Championship IV, the fourth level of the European field hockey championships organized by the European Hockey Federation. It was held from 7 to 11 August 2019 in Helsinki, Finland.

Hungary won their first EuroHockey Championship IV title and was promoted the EuroHockey Championship III.

Teams
The following five teams, shown with pre-tournament world rankings, competed in this tournament.
 (58)
 (64)
 (70)
 (72)
 (81)

Results
All times are local, EEST (UTC+3).

Pool

Matches

Statistics

Final standings

 Promoted to the EuroHockey Championship III

Goalscorers

See also
2019 Men's EuroHockey Championship III

References

External links
FIH page

EuroHockey Championship IV
Men 4
International field hockey competitions hosted by Finland
EuroHockey Championship IV Men
EuroHockey Championship IV Men
International sports competitions in Helsinki
2010s in Helsinki